Harry Oppenheimer Agricultural High School is a public secondary school with a focus on agricultural education located in Limburg, approximately  north of Mokopane in Limpopo, South Africa.

The school was established by South African businessman and philanthropist Harry Oppenheimer as a donation to the then government of Lebowa. 

It has been recognised as a top-performing school within the Limpopo province.

References

1982 establishments in South Africa
High schools in South Africa
Educational institutions established in 1982
Schools in Limpopo